Danniel Thomas-Dodd (née Thomas, born 11 November 1992) is a Jamaican athlete whose specialty is the shot put. She finished 4th in the shot put finals at London's 2017 World Championships in Athletics and the following year she won silver at the Indoor World Championships. In addition, she finished fifth at the 2015 Pan American Games.

She has a personal best and the Jamaican national record in the shot put of 19.55 metres outdoors, set at the 2019 Pan American Games in Lima while winning and setting a new Pan Am record. Indoors, she registered a 19.22 metre throw at Arena Birmingham, Birmingham, England. She also has a personal discus best of 59.38 metres set in Akron in 2014. In July 2021, she qualified to represent Jamaica at the 2020 Summer Olympics. At the 2022 Commonwealth Games, Thomas-Dodd sought to defend her title from four years earlier, and was leading after five throws in the shot put final, only to be passed by Canadian Sarah Mitton by 0.05 metres on the final throw.

Competition record

References

External links
 

1992 births
Living people
Jamaican female shot putters
Jamaican female discus throwers
World Athletics Championships athletes for Jamaica
World Athletics Championships medalists
Athletes (track and field) at the 2014 Commonwealth Games
Athletes (track and field) at the 2015 Pan American Games
People from Westmoreland Parish
Athletes (track and field) at the 2016 Summer Olympics
Olympic athletes of Jamaica
Commonwealth Games medallists in athletics
Commonwealth Games gold medallists for Jamaica
Athletes (track and field) at the 2018 Commonwealth Games
Athletes (track and field) at the 2019 Pan American Games
Pan American Games gold medalists for Jamaica
Pan American Games medalists in athletics (track and field)
Commonwealth Games gold medallists in athletics
Pan American Games gold medalists in athletics (track and field)
Medalists at the 2019 Pan American Games
Athletes (track and field) at the 2020 Summer Olympics
20th-century Jamaican women
21st-century Jamaican women
Medallists at the 2018 Commonwealth Games